Marri may refer to the following people:
Given name
Marri Chenna Reddy (1919–1996), Indian politician
Marri Nallos, pop singer from the Philippines

Surname
Al-Marri, Qatari surname
Alauddin Marri (born 1979), Pakistani businessman and social worker 
Atta Muhammad Marri (1937–1998), Sindhi politician
Balach Marri, leader of the Balochistan Liberation Army in Pakistan
Changez Khan Marri, Pakistani politician, Nawab of the Marri Baloch people in Pakistan
Ghazan Marri, politician from Balochistan, Pakistan 
Giuseppe Marri (1788–1852), Italian engraver
Hyrbyair Marri (born 1968), nationalist from Balochistan, Pakistan
Jumma Khan Marri, Baloch political leader
Khair Bakhsh Marri, Baloch Pakistani politician 
Khuda Bakhsh Marri, Governor of Balochistan, Pakistan
Margret Marri, football player from Burma 
Mehran Marri, Baloch politician
Mir Balach Marri (1966-2007), leader of the Balochistan Liberation Army
Mir Humayun Khan Marri, Deputy Chairman of the Senate of Pakistan
Mohabat Khan Marri, Pakistani politician
Mona Ghanem Al Marri, Indian government media official in the United Arab Emirates
Nawab Changez Khan Marri, chief of the Marri Baloch tribe in Pakistan
Nawaz Marri, Baloch judge
Quratulain Marri, Pakistani politician 
Shazia Marri, Pakistani politician
Sher Mohammad Marri, chief of the Marri Baloch tribe in Pakistan

Italian-language surnames
Pakistani names
Balochi-language surnames